Taner Baybars (1936 – 20 January 2010), who also wrote under the name Timothy Bayliss, was a Cyprus-born British poet, translator and painter.

Life
Baybars contributed to literary magazines in Cyprus and Turkey before moving to England in the 1950s, and adopting English as his literary language. A collection of his manuscripts is held at the University of Reading.

Works

Poetry
 Mendelin Ucundakiler, 1954
 To catch a Falling Man, 1963
 Susila in the Autumn Woods, 1974
  Narcissus in a dry Pool, 1978
 Pregnant shadows, 1981

Prose
 A Trap for the Burglar, 1965
 Plucked in a far-off land: Images in Self-Biography, 1970

Translation
 Selected Poems by Nazim Hikmet. 1967
 The Moscow Symphony by Nazim Hikmet. 1970
 The Day Before Tomorrow by Nazim Hikmet. Oxford: Carcanet Press, 1971
 Don't go back to Kyrenia by Mehmet Yashin. 2000.

References

External links
 Gur Genc, Last Meeting with Taner Baybars, Kunapipi, 33(1), 2011
 Heidi Trautmann, Taner Baybars – A Cypriot Turkish Poet - in memoriam

1936 births
2010 deaths
Turkish Cypriot poets
Turkish-language poets
English-language poets
Turkish–English translators
Cypriot emigrants to the United Kingdom
20th-century translators